This is the list of neighborhoods in Columbus, Georgia. Neighborhoods are generally considered to be housing subdivisions of a city. In some cases, other layers of intervening organization exist (for example, boroughs in New York City) that may not exist in all places.
In the city of Columbus, there exist an intermediate level of organization, called districts or zones.

List 
Downtown
Avondale
Baker Village
Bibb City
City Village
Willett
East Columbus
Kingsridge
Vista Estates
Belvedere Park
Columbia Heights
Mount Pleasant
Dimon Wood
Forest Park
Crystal Valley
Englewood
Flat Rock
Sweetwater
Oakcrest 
Glen Arden 
Midland
Schatulga
Upatoi
Woodlawn Estates
Midtown
Averett Woods
Briarwood
Clubview Heights
Dimon Circle
Dinglewood
East Carver Heights
East Highland
East Wynnton
Garrard Woods
Hilton Heights
Lindsay Creek-Boxwood
Overlook-Wynn's Hill
Peacock Woods
Radcliff
Village of Wynnton
Weracoba - St. Elmo A/K/A Lakebottom
Wildwood Circle - Hillcrest
Woodcrest
Wynnton Grove
North Columbus A/K/A Northside
Allendale
Caroline Park
Fortson
Glenns
Green Island Hills
Highland Pines
Nankipooh
Lyn Hills
Woodbriar
South Columbus
Benning Park
Carter Acres
Oakland Park
Pine Hill
Riverland Terrace
Vista Terrance